John Baptist Purcell (February 26, 1800 – July 4, 1883) was an American prelate of the Catholic Church. He served as Bishop of Cincinnati from 1833 to his death in 1883, and he was elevated to the rank of archbishop in 1850. He formed the basis of Father Ferrand, the Ohio-based "Irish by birth, French by ancestry" character in the prologue of Willa Cather's historical novel Death Comes for the Archbishop who goes to Rome asking for a bishop for New Mexico Territory.

Early life and education
John Baptist Purcell was born at Mallow, County Cork, Ireland on February 26, 1800, the son of Edward and Johanna Purcell who gave their children all the advantages of the education attainable at a time when the penal laws were less rigorously enforced. Purcell decided to seek higher education in the United States. 
Landing at Baltimore, Maryland, he soon obtained a teacher's certificate at Asbury College. He spent a year giving lessons as private tutor in some of the prominent families of Baltimore. His ambition, however, was to become a priest.

On June 20, 1820, he entered Mount St. Mary's Seminary, Emmitsburg, Maryland. His knowledge of the classics helped him take charge of important classes in the college, and at the same time prepare himself for the priesthood by the study of philosophy, theology, and other branches of the ecclesiastical curriculum.

After three years' study in the seminary he received tonsure and minor orders from Archbishop Ambrose Maréchal, of Baltimore, at the close of 1823. On March 1, 1824, in the company of Rev Simon Gabriel Bruté, one of the professors of the seminary, afterwards first Bishop of Vincennes, he sailed for Europe to complete his studies in the Sulpician Seminaries of Issy and Paris. On May 26, 1826, he was one of 300 priests ordained in the cathedral of Paris by Archbishop de Quelen.

Career
After his ordination, Purcell continued his studies until the autumn of 1827, when he returned to the United States to enter Mount St. Mary's Seminary as professor. He afterwards became president, until his appointment as Bishop of Cincinnati, Ohio, to succeed Edward Fenwick. Purcell received notice of his appointment in August 1833, and was consecrated bishop in the cathedral of Baltimore, October 13, 1833, by Archbishop James Whitfield. He attended the sessions of the Third Provincial Council of Baltimore, which opened on the day of his consecration and continued for one week.

Going from Baltimore by stage to Wheeling, and from Wheeling to Cincinnati by steamboat, he reached his destination on November 14, 1833. Bishops Benedict Joseph Flaget and John Baptist Mary David of Bardstown, Rese of Detroit, and a few priests met him and conducted him to the cathedral, which was on Sycamore Street. He was canonically installed by Bishop Flaget.

Founder bishop
On his arrival in 1833 Bishop Purcell found himself in a city of about 30,000 inhabitants and only one Catholic church. The diocese embraced the whole State of Ohio. The difficulties increased, for soon the tide of immigration turned towards Ohio. Immigrants from Germany and Ireland came in thousands, and as most were Catholics it became his duty to provide for their spiritual needs. A seminary had been founded by Bishop Fenwick in the Athenaeum, which stood near the cathedral, but the number of students was as yet very small. He was untiring in his labour, preaching and giving lectures, writing articles for the Telegraph, a Catholic paper founded by Father Young, a nephew of Bishop Fenwick, the first Catholic paper published in the West. He taught classes in the seminary. At his first ordination he raised to the priesthood Henry Damian Juncker, afterwards first Bishop of Alton, Illinois. He lost no time in providing for the wants of the growing Church in Cincinnati. Holy Trinity on Fifth Street, the first church built for the German-speaking Catholics, was soon followed by another, St. Mary's, at Clay and Thirteenth Streets.

In order to staff the seminary and school, Purcell invited the Jesuit Fathers, to whom he entrusted St. Xavier's Church on Sycamore Street. He purchased a site for his new cathedral on Plum and Eighth Streets, and Western Row (now Central Avenue), then the western boundary of Cincinnati. Bishop Purcell began constructing a structure built of Dayton limestone, with a spire of solid stone rising to the height of 225 feet. Saint Peter in Chains Cathedral became one of the West's finest. On October 13, 1846, it was consecrated by Archbishop Samuel Eccleston of Baltimore. After trying several locations for his diocesan seminary, Bishop Purcell finally located it on Price Hill, west of the city limits. The main building was completed in 1851, and named Mount St. Mary's of the West, after his own alma mater at Emmitsburg. Bishop Purcell also established two orphan asylums, St. Aloysius's for the children of German-speaking parents, and St. Peter's (now St. Joseph's) for children of English-speakers.

He made a complete visitation of his extensive diocese the first year of his administration, placing resident pastors in parishes or having priests to visit regularly the smaller communities that were unable to support a resident pastor. Bishop Purcell made several trips to Europe, visiting the various seminaries there, and recruiting missionaries for Ohio and points further west. On one trip, Bishop Purcell returned with Fathers Joseph Projectus Machebeuf and Jean-Baptiste Lamy. Father Machebeuf afterward became the first Bishop of Denver; Father Lamy, the first Archbishop of Santa Fé. In addition, pioneer missionary Stephen Badin spent his last years in the care of the cathedral.

Archbishop
Cincinnati was made a Metropolitan See in 1850. The pallium was conferred on Archbishop Purcell by Pope Pius IX, who at the same time made him assistant at the pontifical throne. The new ecclesiastical province of Cincinnati had for suffragans the Diocese of Cleveland, Detroit, Vincennes, (became Indianapolis in 1898) and Louisville.  In 1851 the city had 13 parishes and 11 parish schools, with an enrollment of 4,494 pupils.

The following religious orders came to the archdiocese during the incumbency of Archbishop Purcell: the Sisters of Charity, founded at Emmitsburg, came to Cincinnati in 1829. In 1852 they formed an independent community, taking the name of the Sisters of Charity of Cincinnati. The Sisters of Notre Dame de Namur, Belgium, came from Belgium in 1840. The Precious Blood Fathers came to Ohio in 1840. The Franciscan Fathers came to the diocese in 1844; the Ursuline Sisters, from France and Germany in 1845; the Good Shepherd Sisters in 1857; the Sisters of Mercy in 1858; Little Sisters of the Poor in 1868; Sisters of the Poor of St. Francis in 1858; Ladies of the Sacred Heart in 1869 and the Passionist Fathers in 1870.

In 1869, Archbishop Purcell attended the Council of the Vatican, and in the discussion of Papal Infallibility he took the side of the minority which opposed the opportuneness of the decision.

Response to Anti-Catholicism
The Catholic Church was unfavourably viewed by non-Catholics at the time, owing to the spread of anti-Catholic literature. One of the most salient events of his episcopate was a series of religious debates with Alexander Campbell (minister). The discussion was to be taken down by shorthand writers, printed after revision by the disputants, and sold, the net proceeds to be distributed equally among Catholic and Protestant charities.

In 1853, Purcell alienated Cincinnati's Protestants by arguing that Catholics should not be taxed to support public schools. Later that year he created controversy when he invited Gaetano Cardinal Bedini, the emissary of Pope Pius IX, to visit Cincinnati. The German Protestant "Forty-Eighters", who had fled Europe after the failed revolutions of 1848, saw Bedini as a symbol of oppression due to his role in putting down revolution in the Papal States in 1849. They organized a protest march to Purcell's residence, where Bedini was staying, on Christmas Day 1853. When the demonstrators clashed with police, several were injured and one died.

Slavery and the Civil War
Until 1861, Archbishop Purcell condemned slavery only in the "abstract", emphasizing the "prudential motives" that made abolition ill-advised, in his opinion. However, according to David J. Endres, "Archbishop John Baptist Purcell of Cincinnati was ...the first American Catholic bishop to offer public support for immediate emancipation of slaves."

Later years
Archbishop Purcell celebrated his golden jubilee of priesthood 26 May 1876. Bishops and archbishops came personally or sent representatives. He had reason to rejoice when he saw the result of his work. When he came to Cincinnati he found a small city with but one church, and a diocese with a few Catholics scattered through the state. After 43 years of toil he found the city grown to a population of nearly 300,000, with 40 well-organized parishes having schools giving Catholic education to 20,000 children, a well-equipped seminary, colleges, and charitable institutions to take care of the poor and sick.

Throughout the diocese were well-organized parishes, churches, and parish schools. Forty years before he had only a few priests; in 1876 he could count on the help of 150 diocesan and 50 regular priests, and a Catholic population of 150,000. In reply to the addresses of congratulation on the occasion, he modestly referred the success to the cordial assistance of the priests and the generous aid of the laity. The serious financial disaster that clouded his last years came as a result of his natural brother and fellow priest, Father Edward Purcell, as well as the long-lasting effects of the Panic of 1873, also known as the Long Depression. Father Purcell took deposits from people who mistrusted banks, which were unstable institutions until the general government adopted national banking regulation. The Cincinnati crash or scandal occurred in the autumn of 1878, shortly after the Great Railroad Strike of 1877 was suppressed. The archbishop died five years later, in St. Martin, Ohio, on July 4, 1883.

After 14 years of litigation and mismanagement of assignees, the affair came to an end when the court found the amount due (with compound interest) from the cathedral and diocesan institutions to be $140,000. Archbishop William Henry Elder, who succeeded Archbishop Purcell, accepted the findings in 1892 and assessed parishes to meet the loans made to pay the judgment, and all the loans were repaid.

Notes

References

Further reading
Hussey, M. Edmund; Archbishop Purcell of Cincinnati (Amazon Kindle ASIN: B006PSMBKI; Barnes and Noble Nook BN ID: 2940013794016)

External links
 
 

1800 births
1883 deaths
19th-century Roman Catholic archbishops in the United States
American Roman Catholic clergy of Irish descent
Roman Catholic bishops of Cincinnati
Roman Catholic archbishops of Cincinnati
Religious leaders from Cincinnati
People from County Cork
Irish emigrants to the United States (before 1923)